Fawad Jalal is a Pakistani actor who predominantly work in Urdu television serials and films. He is best known for his role as Laxman in historical drama Dastaan and as Aazan in Aik Larki Aam Si.

Career 
His appearances include Dastaan, Dekho Chaand Aaya, Naik Parveen, Bilqees Kaur, Yeh Chahatein Yeh Shiddatein, Aik Aur Sitam Hai and Aik Larki Aam Si. In 2016, he made his film debut with a supporting role in Blind Love.

Filmography

Film 
 Blind Love (2016)

Television

References

Pakistani male actors
Year of birth missing (living people)
Living people